Albert Heijn  (15 October 1865 – 13 November 1945) was a Dutch entrepreneur who was the original founder of Albert Heijn, which is now the largest food retailer in the Netherlands. On his wedding day in 1887, he took over the grocery store of his father, Jan Simonsz Heijn, and the supermarket chain founded by his grandson Albert Jr. still carries the Albert Heijn name.

The first Albert Heijn store still exists today as a Museum at Zaanse Schans near Amsterdam in the Netherlands.

Heijn handed over the management of the company in 1920, to his sons Jan Heijn and Gerrit Heijn, and his son-in-law Johan Hille. Later, his grandchildren Albert and Gerrit Jan Heijn would further expand the family business.

References 

1865 births
1945 deaths
People from Oostzaan
Dutch chief executives in the retail industry
Dutch businesspeople